VAHP can refer to:
 Vapor Absorption Heat Pump, a type of Absorption heat pump
 The Vietnamese American Heritage Project, a project by the Vietnam Center and Archives